Camilla Sparv (born 3 June 1943) is a Swedish actress.

Career
Sparv was born in Stockholm, Sweden, on 3 June 1943. She was awarded a Golden Globe as Most Promising Newcomer (female) in 1967 for her role opposite James Coburn in Dead Heat on a Merry-Go-Round (1966). She also appeared in such films as Murderers' Row (1966), The Trouble with Angels (1966), Assignment K (1968), Nobody Runs Forever (1968), Mackenna's Gold (1969), Downhill Racer (1969), The Greek Tycoon (1978), Caboblanco (1980), and Survival Zone (1983), as well as the television shows Airwolf, The Rockford Files (SE2EP19), The Love Boat, Hawaii Five-O and the miniseries Jacqueline Susann's Valley of the Dolls (1981). In 1977, she appeared in "Never Con a Killer," the pilot for the ABC crime drama The Feather and Father Gang.

Personal life  
Sparv was briefly married to American film producer Robert Evans in 1965. Now retired, Sparv had two children by her second husband, Herbert W. Hoover III, and one child with her third, Fred Kolber.

References

External links

1943 births
Living people
Actresses from Stockholm
Swedish film actresses
New Star of the Year (Actress) Golden Globe winners
Evans family (Paramount Pictures)